Sebastian Denis de Souza (born 19 April 1993) is an English actor. He is best known for playing Matty Levan in the E4 teen drama series Skins. He has since starred in the period television series The Borgias from 2012 to 2013, Medici: Masters of Florence (2018), and The Great (2020).

Early life
De Souza is the second of the two sons of Elinor Kelly and Chris de Souza, an opera producer of Goan Indian descent. He was born in Oxford, Oxfordshire, and has an older brother named Tristan. He grew up in Boxford, Berkshire, and was a boarder at Brockhurst and Marlston House School developing a fascination with theatre, music, and writing. At the age of 11 he decided to dramatise The Willows at Christmas, William Horwood's adaptation of The Wind in the Willows, and performed it in the barn with his classmates. In 2006, when he was 13, he starred in the short film Hangman, premiered at the Corn Exchange. It was a story of witchcraft in the mould of Macbeth, that he co-wrote with the Prep School's Film Club.

He went on to St Edward's School, Oxford, where in 2006 he won a music award as a pianist, clarinettist and singer. He later completed A-levels in English, History and Philosophy. He also attended acting workshops at the Watermill Theatre, near Newbury. At the North Wall Arts Centre, he performed lead roles in school productions of A Midsummer Night's Dream playing Puck, Great Expectations as Pip, C. P. Taylor's Good as Maurice, and Henry V as Henry, which earned him a drama prize in 2010. In the same year he became a member of the National Youth Theatre.

Career
After a brief appearance in Nick Ross's documentary series The Truth About Crime, de Souza got his break on television at the age of 17, when he was cast as Matty Levan in the fifth and sixth instalment of cult drama Skins. In 2012, he joined the cast of historical drama The Borgias, created by Neil Jordan for the American TV network Showtime and filmed at Korda Studios, near Budapest. His character, Alfonso d'Aragona, first appeared in The Confession and closed his run at the end of the third and final season. While in Hungary, he was filmmaker with photographer Benjamin Lebus for Evelyne's World, a concept short film about the allegory of the Cave starring Evelyne Brochu.

De Souza's first big screen role is in Julian Gilbey's thriller Plastic. Production took place in early 2013 on location in Miami and London. As a screenplay writer, he made his cinematic debut in Kids in Love, a film produced by Ealing Studios with de Souza also taking a title role. In 2014, he was cast as the male lead in a new Freeform show called Recovery Road, which was broadcast for a single season in 2016.

In addition to his acting career, de Souza is a singer and musician. In 2011 he's featured as a guest vocalist for Cubiq in their Say EP released by Hidden Label. The tune, related to current electro club music, has been remixed by Matanza and Timmy P in an alternative version that fits the traditional house template. In 2016, the Recovery Road cast including Sebastian performed for the spring finale a musical ensemble version of Lean On Me by Bill Withers.

De Souza also works in the field of producing. In 2013 he co-founded with actor Will Poulter the TV and film production company Good Soil. The following year he created his own brand management called de Souza aimed at helping young storytellers, producers or filmmakers develop their scripts.

In March 2021 de Souza's first novel, Kid: A History of The Future, was published by Offliner Press, a publisher established and owned by de Souza himself.

Personal life
With his family, de Souza annually runs drama courses for 9 to 16 year olds at a home-based Centre for Music Drama and Art. In 2013 he has been made a patron of The Globe Theatre Education Fund, which runs drama projects for schools around the country, mostly Shakespearean. Through a practical experience provided by orchestras he can sing in the tenor range and play different instruments.

Filmography

Film

Television

Stage

Music videos

References

External links
 
 
 

1993 births
English male film actors
English male television actors
English male stage actors
English screenwriters
English male screenwriters
21st-century English male actors
English film producers
People educated at St Edward's School, Oxford
National Youth Theatre members
English male Shakespearean actors
English people of Portuguese descent
British people of Portuguese descent
British people of Goan descent
People from West Berkshire District
Actors from Oxford
Living people